The Benjamin P. Westervelt House, located at 253 County Road in Cresskill, Bergen County, New Jersey, was the home of Benjamin P. Westervelt, a member of the local militia during the American Revolutionary War.  The main wing of the Dutch Colonial-style house was built by Westervelt in 1808, but the Westervelt family has continuously occupied the site since at least 1778.

The house, which has been used as a background in several films, was listed on New Jersey Register of Historic Places in 1980, and the National Register of Historic Places in 1983.

See also 

 National Register of Historic Places listings in Bergen County, New Jersey

References

External links

Cresskill, New Jersey
Houses completed in 1808
Houses in Bergen County, New Jersey
Houses on the National Register of Historic Places in New Jersey
National Register of Historic Places in Bergen County, New Jersey
New Jersey Register of Historic Places